Renu Malhotra (born 1961) is an American planetary scientist from India, known for using the orbital resonance between Pluto and Neptune to infer large-scale orbital migration of the giant planets and to predict the existence of Plutinos in resonance with Neptune. The asteroid 6698 Malhotra was named for her on 14 December 1997.

Early life and career 

Renu Malhotra was born in New Delhi in 1961. Her father was an aircraft engineer at Indian Airlines. Her family moved to Hyderabad when she was a child. She attended the Indian Institute of Technology Delhi, graduating with an M.S. degree in Physics in 1983. Malhotra then attended Cornell University, where she was introduced to non-linear dynamics by Mitchell Feigenbaum. She received her Ph.D. degree in Physics from Cornell in 1988, with Stanley F. Dermott as her doctoral advisor. With the help of Peter Goldreich who had read her paper on the moons of Uranus, she obtained a postdoctoral research position at California Institute of Technology. She then worked for nine years at Lunar and Planetary Institute, where she completed work on Pluto's orbital resonance and predicted the resonant structure of the Kuiper Belt. Malhotra is currently a professor at the University of Arizona's Lunar and Planetary Laboratory.

Awards and honors 
 1997 Harold C. Urey Prize
 2006 Outstanding Alumnus Award from Indian Institute of Technology Delhi 
 2010 Galileo Circle Fellow, University of Arizona
 2015 American Academy of Arts and Sciences
 2015 National Academy of Sciences
 2016 Louise Foucar Marshall Science Research Professor
 2016 Regents' Professor, University of Arizona

See also

References 
 

1961 births
Cornell University alumni
Discoverers of minor planets
IIT Delhi alumni
20th-century Indian physicists
Living people
People from New Delhi
Indian theoretical physicists
University of Arizona faculty
Scientists from Delhi
Indian emigrants to the United States